Rrahman Rama is a Kosovan Albanian military officer, and the former Commander of the Kosovo Security Force from 18 March 2015 to 30 November 2021.

Military career
In 2015, Rama was made the new Commander of the Kosovo Security Force by Presidential Decree, issued by President Atifete Jahjaga.

In 2020, Rama met with Macedonian President Stevo Pendarovski in Skopje. Rama supported North Macedonia's NATO membership claiming it would have a positive impact on the stability and prosperity of the entire region.

During an interview with Radio Kosova e Lirë, Rrahman Rama said the transformation of the Kosovo Security Force into Kosovo Armed Forces is a process that has started in cooperation with international partners.

On November 30, 2021, Rrahman Rama resigned from the post of Commander of Kosovo Security Force, being replaced by the nephew of the Kosovo Liberation Army founder Adem Jashari, Bashkim Jashari, who is at the same time the son of his aunt.

References

1967 births
Living people
Kosovo Albanians